RBP may refer to:
 Red blood cells (erythrocytes or RBCs- the RB in this case), and blood plasma (the P), a blood transfusion product (there is some preliminary evidence to show that people do better after trauma if given both red blood cells and blood plasma, especially if it is combined into one bag, instead of separate bags for plasma and red blood cells)
 Retinol binding protein
 RNA-binding protein
 Rock's Backpages, an Internet archive of rock music journalism
 Lord Robert Baden-Powell
 Rock Bottom Price, code name for the Atari ST home computer